Prionosciadium bellii is a plant species endemic to the Mexican State of Michoacán.

Flowers are reddish-purple or greenish-yellow.

References

Apioideae
Endemic flora of Mexico
Flora of Michoacán
Taxa named by Lincoln Constance
Taxa named by Mildred Esther Mathias